Akmal Tursunbaev (born 14 July 1993) is a Uzbekistani footballer who plays as a goalkeeper for Brunei DPMM FC of the Singapore Premier League.

Club career
Having made his development at Uzbek football powerhouses Pakhtakor and Bunyodkor,  Tursunbaev went on loan to FK Andijon of the Uzbekistan First League in 2013, and won promotion to the 2014 Uzbek League. He was transferred to Pakhtakor where he played as a backup goalkeeper as the Tashkent club twice became league champions while he was there.

He subsequently returned to Andijon but could not save them from relegation at the end of the 2016 Uzbek League season. He moved to other Higher League clubs such as FK Buxoro and Metallurg Bekabad before dropping a division to play for FK Turon Yaypan where they finished third in the 2022 season. He played in the promotion/relegation play-off against Lokomotiv Tashkent on 25 November and won 2–1, sending Turon to the top flight.

Tursunbaev moved to Bruneian club DPMM FC after completing a trial in January 2023. He put pen to paper on 28 February of that year. He made his debut away against Lion City Sailors on 3 March which resulted in a defeat to the Bruneian side 3–1.

International career

Tursunbaev was part of the national youth setup of his country from 2010 to 2014. He was part of the Uzbekistan under-20 squad for the 2013 FIFA U-20 World Cup held in Turkey. He then played three games for the under-23s for the 2016 AFC U-23 Championship qualification matches hosted by Bangladesh. He kept clean sheets against India and the host nation.

References

External links

1993 births
Living people
Association football goalkeepers
Uzbekistani footballers
Uzbekistani expatriate footballers
FC Bunyodkor players
Pakhtakor Tashkent FK players
FK Andijon players
PFK Nurafshon players
PFK Metallurg Bekabad players
DPMM FC players
Uzbekistan Super League players
Uzbekistan Pro League players
Singapore Premier League players
Expatriate footballers in Brunei
Uzbekistani expatriate sportspeople in Brunei